Napalm is the seventh studio album by American rapper Xzibit. It was released on October 9, 2012 through Open Bar Entertainment, making it his first album since 2006's Full Circle. It features guest appearances from Demrick, Slim the Mobster, The Game, Wiz Khalifa, Bishop Lamont, B-Real, Brevi, Crooked I, David Banner, E-40, King T, Prodigy, RBX, Tha Alkaholiks and Trena Joiner.

The album debuted at number 150 on the Billboard 200 with first-week sales of 3,200 copies in the United States.

Background
After the commercial failure of his last studio album Full Circle in 2006, Xzibit was released from his contract with Koch Records and mainly focused on his acting career. No new material for a new studio album surfaced until 2009, when he released the song "Hurt Locker", followed by "Phenom" in early 2010 for his new studio album, then titled MMX (2010 in Roman numerals). But since none of the singles made a commercial impact, the album was not released that year, prompting him to change the name to MMXI. The album was renamed Restless 2 in late 2011 and again renamed to its current title after the success of his collaboration "Napalm" with Travis Barker for his mixtape Let the Drummer Get Wicked.

Singles
The album's single "Phenom" was released on May 25, 2010 on iTunes, produced by Risingson and features vocals from rapper Kurupt with whom Xzibit had already worked on previous albums, and G-Unit rapper 40 Glocc. The album's lead single "Up Out The Way" was released on September 4, 2012, featuring fellow West Coast rapper E-40 and was produced by Rick Rock. It was released on the radio Power 106, with Xzibit and DJ Felli Fel.

Critical reception

Napalm was met with generally favorable reviews from music critics. At Metacritic, which assigns a normalized rating out of 100 to reviews from mainstream publications, the album received an average score of 66 based on six reviews.

Matt Jost of RapReviews found the album "remarkably focused, not forsaking the established Xzibit sound but neither rehashing it". HipHopDX writer said: "Napalm finds X fluctuating between trying to recapture the sound he perfected when he was cavorting with the Aftermath staff, and exploring elder statesmanship a la "Thank You" from 2006's Full Circle. When he goes too far in pursuit of either extreme, Napalm falters". AllMusic's Fred Thomas wrote: "What's delivered is another robust collection of business as usual, with the surprising diversions adding just enough dimension to the album to even it out". Ted Scheinman of Slant Magazine said: "Napalm comes on in old-school fashion, with beats as mere vehicles for lyrics, and lyrics that work on a reassuring number of levels".

In a mised review, Christopher Minaya of XXL called the work "a well-rounded LP full of illustrative and cohesive tracks, while surviving a few average hooks, such as on 'Gangsta Gangsta'". In a negative review, Richard Wink of Drowned in Sound stated: "Napalm is a long ass 18 track slog, and the pointless thug boasts scattered throughout the album".

Track listing

Personnel

 1500 or Nothin' – producers (tracks: 11, 19)
 Albert Johnson – featured artist (track 4)
 Aliaune Thiam – producer (track 15)
 Alvin Joiner – primary artist, executive producer
 Andre Young – producer (track 13)
 Anthony Johnson – featured artist (tracks: 8, 15)
 Bernard Edwards Jr. – producer (track 17)
Cameron Thomaz – featured artist (tracks: 6, 14)
Dan Gerbarg – mastering
David L. Drew – featured artist & producer (track 20)
Demerick Ferm – featured artist (tracks: 15, 17, 20)
DJ Chill – producer (track 5)
Dominick Wickliffe – featured artist (track 15)
Eart Stevens – featured artist (track 10)
Eliot Dubock – producer (track 1)
Eric Allan Dan – producer (track 6)
Eric Dwayne Collins – featured artist (track 3)
Eric Weaver – assistant mixing
Ferrell Wayne Miles – producer (tracks: 7, 18)
Howie Weinberg – mastering
Jay Turner – engineering
Jayceon Taylor – featured artist (tracks: 3, 15)
Karl Amani Wailoo – producer (track 4)
Kory B. Garnett – featured artist (track 14)
Larry Griffin Jr. – producer (tracks: 8, 12)
Lavell Crump – featured artist & producer (track 14)
Louis Freese – featured artist (tracks: 17, 20)
 Mark Thomas Landon III – producer (track 8)
 Matt Alonzo – photography
Peter Mokran – mixing
Philip Martin – featured artist (track 17)
Ramon Ibanga Jr. – producer (track 16)
Ricardo Thomas – producer (tracks: 2, 3, 10)
Roger McBride – featured artist (track 13)
 Ronald Fair – strings arrangement (tracks: 7, 18)
 Ret. Staff Sgt. Shilo Harris – featured artist (track 12)
 Tha Alkaholiks – featured artists (track 13)
 Thomas Jamal McCray Jr. – producer (track 9)
Trena Joiner – featured artist (tracks: 7, 18)

Charts

Release history

References

External links

2012 albums
Xzibit albums
Albums produced by Akon
Albums produced by Dr. Dre
Albums produced by Illmind
Albums produced by Focus...
Albums produced by Rick Rock
Albums produced by Saukrates
Albums produced by Beat Butcha
Albums produced by David Banner
Albums produced by Symbolyc One
Albums produced by 1500 or Nothin'